Salvatore "Sal" Stabile is an American television and feature film writer, director and producer. Born in Brooklyn, New York in 1974, he directed his first feature film, Gravesend (1997), when he was 19 years old. Stabile has gone on to write for numerous television shows, including The Sopranos (2001) and Rescue Me (2004).

Early life
Salvatore Stabile was born and raised in a section of Brooklyn known as Gravesend, close to Coney Island. He graduated from Xaverian High School in Bay Ridge, then attended New York University Tisch School of the Arts.

Stabile began writing while he was in high school. He wrote an unpublished memoir about his life growing up in Brooklyn, then later adapted a portion of the book into his first feature film, called Gravesend. Stabile wrote, directed and produced Gravesend when he was 19 years old. The film premiered at the Hamptons Film Festival, then went on to compete in the Seattle Film Festival and the Torino Film Festival, where it was nominated for Best Film in the International Feature Film Competition. The gritty independent film, made for under $10,000, quickly caught the eye of Hollywood. After screening Gravesend, Oliver Stone attached himself an executive producer to help Stabile secure distribution for the independent film. Shortly after, Palm Pictures purchased Gravesend and released the movie in the Fall of 1997. During that time, Steven Spielberg awarded Stabile with a two picture feature deal at DreamWorks.

Career
In 2001, Stabile wrote for The Sopranos. He wrote episode 6 of season 3, called "University". In 2002, Stabile was a story editor and wrote for Fastlane, a series for Fox, produced by MC G, starring Bill Bellamy and Peter Facinelli. In 2004, he went to write and co-produce Rescue Me, starring Denis Leary. In 2005, Stabile wrote for the FX television show called Over There. In 2007, Stabile wrote, directed and produced his second film called Where God Left His Shoes starring John Leguizamo, Leonora Varela, Jerry Ferrara and David Castro. Paul Allen and his Vulcan Films production company financed the movie. Where God Left His Shoes was later purchased and released by IFC Films. Where God Left His Shoes was nominated for several Imagen Awards, and it went on to win the Humanitas Prize in the Sundance Feature Film category in 2007.

In 2010, Stabile was a writer and supervising producer on the television show called My Generation for ABC. In 2011, he was also a writer and supervising producer on Revenge for ABC. In 2013, Stabile worked as a writer and co-executive producer for the Starz series called Power.
Stabile is currently in preproduction on his next feature film, called A Civil Right. The film is based on the true story of Dr. Gilbert Mason, and will star Michael Ealy. A Civil Right is slated to shoot in the Spring of 2015. Stabile is also currently writing a television pilot for John Leguizamo at AMC, and is also writing and producing a mini-series for E! based on the Gucci family.

References

Film directors from New York City
1974 births
Living people